is a Japanese sprint canoer who competed in the early to mid-1970s. He was eliminated in the repechages of the C-2 1000 m event at the 1972 Summer Olympics in Munich. Four years later in Montreal, Hata was eliminated in the semifinals of the C-2 1000 m event while being disqualified in the repechages of the C-2 500 m event.

External links
Sports-reference.com profile

1948 births
Canoeists at the 1972 Summer Olympics
Canoeists at the 1976 Summer Olympics
Japanese male canoeists
Living people
Olympic canoeists of Japan